Susannah Dickey is a novelist and poet from Derry in Northern Ireland. 

Dickey received an Eric Gregory Award from the Society of Authors in 2020. Her first novel, Tennis Lessons, was published by Doubleday UK in 2020. Her second novel, Common Decency, followed in 2022, and was reviewed in The Times, the Irish Times and The Guardian. She has published several poetry pamphlets, including I had some very slight concerns (The Lifeboat Press, 2017), Genuine human values (The Lifeboat Press, 2018), Bloodthirsty for Marriage (Bad Betty Press, 2020) and Oh! (The Lifeboat Press, 2022). Her first collection of poetry, Isdal, will be published by Picador in September 2023.

References 

Year of birth missing (living people)
Living people
21st-century novelists from Northern Ireland
21st-century women writers from Northern Ireland
21st-century poets from Northern Ireland
Women poets from Northern Ireland
Women novelists from Northern Ireland
Writers from Derry (city)